A Crescent Honeymoon is the first EP by San Francisco indie rock band Communiqué.

Track listing

References

2003 debut EPs
Communiqué (band) EPs